Asproinocybe is a genus of fungi in the family Tricholomataceae. The genus contains five species found in tropical Africa.

See also

List of Tricholomataceae genera

References

External links

Tricholomataceae
Agaricales genera